Peter Morris (born 8 November 1943 in Stockbridge) is an English former professional footballer and manager. During his career he made over 300 appearances for Mansfield Town and over 200 for Ipswich Town. His one goal for Norwich City was scored against title-chasing Queens Park Rangers on 17 April 1976. He was also a manager with numerous league and non-league clubs, and notably was player-manager when Mansfield Town were promoted to the Second Division in 1976-77.

External links
Peter Morris at Sporting Heroes

Living people
1943 births
English footballers
Association football midfielders
English Football League players
Mansfield Town F.C. players
Ipswich Town F.C. players
Norwich City F.C. players
Peterborough United F.C. players
English football managers
English Football League managers
Kettering Town F.C. managers
Boston United F.C. managers
Mansfield Town F.C. managers
Peterborough United F.C. managers
Crewe Alexandra F.C. managers
Southend United F.C. managers
King's Lynn F.C. managers